The Lady of Death (Spanish:La Dama de la Muerte) is a 1946 Chilean thriller film directed by Carlos Hugo Christensen for Chile Films S.A. and starring Carlos Cores, Judith Sulian and Guillermo Battaglia. The film is based on the short story The Suicide Club by Robert Louis Stevenson.

Cast

References

Bibliography 
 Rist, Peter H. Historical Dictionary of South American Cinema. Rowman & Littlefield, 2014.

External links 

1946 films
Chilean thriller films
1946 horror films
1940s thriller films
1940s Spanish-language films
Films directed by Carlos Hugo Christensen
Chilean black-and-white films
Films based on works by Robert Louis Stevenson